Isolepis crassiuscula is a species of flowering plant in the sedge family. It is native to Australasia and Japan. It was first described by the botanist Joseph Dalton Hooker in 1859.

References

crassiuscula
Flora of Eastern Asia
Flora of Japan
Flora of Papua New Guinea
Plants described in 1859